Philip David Sykes (born July 24, 1970 in Tacoma, Washington) is a former field hockey defender from the United States, who was a member of the national team that finished twelfth at the 1996 Summer Olympics in Atlanta, Georgia.

Sykes earned his bachelor's degree in kinesiology from California State University, Hayward, in 1999.

References
 US Field Hockey

External links
 

1970 births
Living people
American male field hockey players
Olympic field hockey players of the United States
Field hockey players at the 1996 Summer Olympics
Sportspeople from Tacoma, Washington
Cornell University people
Towson University
California State University, East Bay alumni
American field hockey coaches
Pan American Games bronze medalists for the United States
Pan American Games medalists in field hockey
Field hockey players at the 1995 Pan American Games
Medalists at the 1995 Pan American Games